Grotte (Sicilian: Grutti) is a comune (municipality) in the Province of Agrigento in the Italian region Sicily, located about  southeast of Palermo and about  northeast of Agrigento.

Grotte borders the following municipalities: Aragona, Campofranco, Comitini, Favara, Milena, Racalmuto.

Twin towns
 Lenola, Italy
 Militello Rosmarino, Italy
 Mircea Vodă, Romania

References

External links
Official website 
 

Cities and towns in Sicily